Shepard Industrial is a  neighbourhood in the southeast quadrant of Calgary, Alberta. Although predominantly industrial, it contains a pocket of residential area in the northwest corner, including a mobile home park.

It is represented in the Calgary City Council by Ward 9 and 12 councillors.

Demographics

Residents in this community had a median household income of $37,383 in 2000, and there were 25.1% low income residents living in the neighbourhood. As of 2000, 6.9% of the residents were immigrants. All buildings were single-family detached homes or mobile homes, and 7.1% of the housing was used for renting.

See also
List of neighbourhoods in Calgary

References

Neighbourhoods in Calgary